Antun Fabris (April 17, 1864 – October 14, 1904), was a journalist, essayist, publisher and politician from Dubrovnik who was one of the leaders of the Serb-Catholic movement in Dubrovnik.

Biography
The ancestors of Antun Fabris came to the mainland from the island of Korčula. After finishing basic studies in Dubrovnik he went on to Vienna, where he graduated in Slavic studies from the university there in 1889. He was a teacher first in Split and then Zadar. In 1895 he became the owner, publisher and editor-in-chief of the prominent Dubrovnik newspaper. In 1902 he formed his own paper in Dubrovnik, the Srđ ("Срђ"), with his wife, and professor Luko Zore, the editor-in-chief, and the support of other Catholic Serbs. It was a science and culture journal for Serb intellectuals in Dalmatia, published twice a month until 1908 in both Cyrillic and Latin scripts, with cooperation of many intellectuals across Dalmatia and several writers from Mostar, notably Aleksa Šantić, Jovan Dučić, Marko Car and Vladimir Ćorović, as well as some from Serbia, namely Jovan Jovanović Zmaj. The Srđ contributed greatly to the preservation of Dubrovnik's rich cultural and historical heritage. As a respected Serb journalist, he was a Deputy President of the Pan-Serb Journalist Congress in Belgrade on 14 and 15 October 1902.

For publishing in the Srđ the song of Uroš Trojanović "Boccan night" (Bokeška noć) dedicated to the youth of Boka kotorska Antun was under ideological accusations arrested on 5 November 1902 and kept in prison until 23 December 1902. Three others were also arrested, interrogated and imprisoned, Uroš Trojanović, the author of the poem, Luko Zore, and Antun Pasarić, Fabris's co-editors. Fabris's term, however short in prison, greatly jeopardized his poor health, causing his premature death in 1904. The Srđ was taken over by Antonije Vučetić. Co-editors of the Srđ were Kristo Dominković, Luko Zore, Miho Vacchetti, Antun Pugliese, Uroš Desnica, and others.

Fabris was also the manager of Dubrovnik's "Matica srpska". He was a great admirer of Nikola Pašić and contributed to the initiative to found the "Srpska Zora"-"Српска зора" (Serb Dawn), a Dalmatian Serb cultural society in 1901.

Legacy

Antun Fabris will be remembered for helping keep alive a national consciousness during periods of statelessness and political repression not only in Dalmatia, but in Bosnia Herzegovina as well.

In 1940 a book entitled Izabrani članci Antuna Fabrisa (Selected articles by Antun Fabris) was published by Henrik Barić.

References

Further reading
 Jovan Skerlić, Istorija nove srpske književnosti / History of Modern Serbian Literature (Belgrade, 1921), pages 360–366.
 Serbian Studies, Volumes 9–10, North American Society for Serbian Studies, 1995, p. 33.
 
 

Writers from Dubrovnik
People from the Kingdom of Dalmatia
Austro-Hungarian politicians
Serbian journalists
Serb-Catholic movement in Dubrovnik
1904 deaths
1864 births